Ivan Ivanovich (Ива́н Иванович) (March 28, 1554 – November 19, 1581) was a Tsarevich (heir apparent) of Russia and the son of Ivan the Terrible, who killed him in a fit of rage.

Early life
Ivan was the second son of Ivan the Terrible by his first wife Anastasia Romanovna. His brother was Feodor. The young Ivan accompanied his father during the Massacre of Novgorod at the age of 15. For five weeks, he and his father would watch the Oprichniks with enthusiasm and retire to church for prayer. At age 27, Ivan was at least as well read as his father, and in his free time, wrote a biography on Antony of Siya. Ivan is reputed to have once saved his father from an assassination attempt. A Livonian prisoner named Bykovski raised a sword against the Tsar, only to be rapidly stabbed by the Tsarevich.

Marriages
In 1566, it was suggested that the 12-year-old Ivan marry Virginia Eriksdotter, daughter of King Eric XIV of Sweden, but this did not come about. At the age of seventeen, Ivan was betrothed to Eudoxia Saburova, who had previously been proposed as a bride for Tsar Ivan. Indeed, she had been one of twelve women paraded before the Tsar in a bride-show for him to make a choice. The Tsar had rejected Eudoxia as a bride for himself but she was later married to the Tsar's son. The Tsar wanted his daughter-in-law to produce an heir very quickly, and this did not happen, so the Tsar banished her to a convent and found another bride for his son. This second wife was Praskovia Solova, who met quickly with the same fate as her predecessor, and was also put away into a convent. A third wife was found for Ivanovic, Yelena Sheremeteva, who was found to be pregnant in October 1581. That child was presumably miscarried around the time when Ivan died by his father's hand in November 1581.

Death
Ivan Ivanovich is believed to have been killed by his father, Ivan the Terrible.

Some sources claim Ivan Ivanovich's relationship with his father began to deteriorate during the later stages of the Livonian War. Angry with his father for his military failures, Ivan demanded to be given command of some troops to liberate besieged Pskov.

Their relationship allegedly further deteriorated when on 15 November 1581, the Tsar, after seeing his pregnant daughter-in-law wearing unconventionally light clothing, physically assaulted her. Hearing her screams, the Tsarevich rushed to his wife's defense, angrily shouting, "You sent my first wife to a convent for no reason, you did the same with my second, and now you strike the third, causing the death of the son she holds in her womb." Yelena subsequently suffered a miscarriage. The Tsarevich confronted his father on the matter, only to have the topic changed to his insubordination regarding Pskov. The elder Ivan accused his son of inciting rebellion, which the younger Ivan denied, but vehemently stuck to the view that Pskov should be liberated. Angered, Ivan's father struck him on the head with his sceptre. Boris Godunov, who was present at the scene, tried to intervene but received blows himself. The younger Ivan fell, barely conscious and with a bleeding wound on his temple. The elder Ivan immediately threw himself at his son, kissing his face and trying to stop the bleeding, whilst repeatedly crying, "May I be damned! I've killed my son! I've killed my son!" The younger Ivan briefly regained consciousness and was reputed to have said "I die as a devoted son and most humble servant". For the next few days, the elder Ivan prayed incessantly for a miracle, but to no avail, and the Tsarevich died on 19 November 1581.

Ivan's death had grave consequences for Russia, since it left no competent heir to the throne. After the Tsar's death in 1584, his unprepared son Feodor I succeeded him with Godunov as de facto ruler. After Feodor's death, Russia entered a period of political uncertainty known as the Time of Troubles.

Ancestry

References

Sources 
 Troyat, Henri Ivan le Terrible. Flammarion, Paris, 1982
 de Madariaga, Isabel Ivan the Terrible. Giulio Einaudi editore, 2005
 Robert Payne and Nikita Romanoff, Ivan The Terrible (New York, 2002)

Russian tsareviches
Heirs apparent who never acceded
Murdered Russian royalty
1554 births
1581 deaths
People murdered in Russia
16th-century Russian people
Deaths by beating in Europe